Lac des Rouges Truites (literally Lake of the Red Trouts) is a lake at the village of Lac-des-Rouges-Truites in the Jura department of France.

Rouges Truites